The United Socialist Party of Korea was a Left-wing political party in South Korea. The party was founded in the spring of 1961, through the merger of two groups. The party was led by Kim Chul.

The newly founded party applied for membership in the Socialist International. The party was crushed after the 1961 military takeover of the country. It was banned, most of its leading members arrested and three of its leaders (two editors and a publisher of the party organ Minjok Ilbo) were sentenced to death.

The party was refounded at a congress in Seoul on September 20, 1966. At the time, the party was an observer member of the Socialist International. It claimed a membership of 17,500.

References

Socialist parties in South Korea
Defunct political parties in South Korea
Political parties established in 1961
Formerly banned socialist parties
Banned political parties in South Korea